The Catholic Church in Syria is part of the worldwide Catholic Church, under the spiritual leadership of the Pope in Rome.

There are 368,000 Catholics in Syria (and its refugee diaspora), approximately 2% of the total population. The Catholics of Syria are members of several different Rite/language-specific Churches, including Armenian, Chaldean, Syriac, Maronite and Melkite in addition to the Latin Church, and there are separate but overlapping jurisdictions for the faithful of each Church.

All these bishops are members of the 'national' Assembly of Catholic Ordinaries in Syria and of the (vast) regional Episcopal Conference for Arab countries. The Eastern Catholic bishops also belong to the (international) synod of their patriarchate or other specific church.

Dioceses and Archdioceses 
 

Eastern Catholic particular Churches

Byzantine Rite
 Melkite Greek Catholic Patriarchate of Antioch (in Damascus) 
 Metropolitan Melkite Greek Catholic Archeparchy of Aleppo
 Metropolitan Melkite Greek Catholic Archeparchy of Bosra and Hauran
 Metropolitan Melkite Greek Catholic Archeparchy of Damascus
 Metropolitan Melkite Greek Catholic Archeparchy of Homs
 Melkite Greek Catholic Archeparchy of Latakia

Antiochian Rites
Maronites (no Metropolitan)
 Maronite Catholic Archeparchy of Aleppo
 Maronite Catholic Archeparchy of Damascus
 Maronite Catholic Eparchy of Latakia (Lattaquié)
Syriac (Syrian) Catholic
 Metropolitan Syrian Catholic Archeparchy of Damascus
 Metropolitan Syrian Catholic Archdiocese of Homs
 Syrian Catholic Archeparchy of Aleppo
 Syriac Catholic Archeparchy of Hassaké-Nisibi

Armenian Rite (no Metropolitan)
 Armenian Catholic Archeparchy of Aleppo
 Armenian Catholic Eparchy of Kamichlié
 Armenian Catholic Patriarchal Exarchate of Damascus

Syro-Oriental Rite (no Archeparchy)
 Chaldean Catholic Eparchy of Aleppo

Latin Church
 Apostolic Vicariate of Aleppo (exempt Roman Catholic missionary jurisdiction)

Cathedrals 
 Cathedral of Our Lady of Dormition (Greek-Melkite Catholic Archdiocese of Bosra–Haūrān)
 Cathedral of Our Lady of Latakia (Maronite Catholic Diocese of Lattaquié)
 Cathedral of Our Lady of the Annunciation (Greek-Melkite Catholic Archdiocese of Lattaquié)
 Cathedral of Our Lady of the Assumption (Syrian Catholic Archdiocese of Aleppe)
 Cathedral of St. Francis of Assisi (Roman Catholic Apostolic Vicariate of Aleppe)
 Cathedral of the Holy Spirit (Syrian Catholic Archdiocese of Homs)
 Cathedral Our Lady of Reliefs (Armenian Catholic Archdiocese of Aleppe)
 Church of the Queen of the Universe (Armenian Catholic Patriarchal Exarchate of Damas)
 Greek-Melkite Cathedral of Our Lady of Peace (Greek-Melkite Catholic Archdiocese of Homs)
 Greek-Melkite Cathedral of the Virgin Mary (Greek-Melkite Catholic Archdiocese of Aleppe)
 Greek-Melkite Patriarchal Cathedral of the Dormition of Our Lady (Greek-Melkite Catholic Patriarchal See of Antioch)
 Maronite Cathedral (Maronite Catholic Archdiocese of Damas)
 St. Elias Maronite Cathedral (Maronite Catholic Archdiocese of Aleppe)
 St. Joseph’s Cathedral (Chaldean Catholic Diocese of Aleppe)
 Syrian Cathedral (Syrian Catholic Archdiocese of Damas)

Syrian popes
Seven popes from Syria ascended the papal throne, many of them lived in Italy, Pope Gregory III, was previously the last pope to have been born outside Europe until the election of Francis in 2013.

See also
Syriac Catholic Church
Eastern Catholic Churches
List of Syrian popes
List of Saints from Asia

References
 GCatholic.org
 Catholic-Hierarchy

External links
Profile of the Catholic church in Syria